Namtok Si Dit is a waterfall and tourist attraction in Thailand. The waterfall is on the Wang Thong River and it runs throughout the year.  At the falls, there is a rice mortar using power generated from the waterfall, built by the Communist Party of Thailand.

References

Si Dit
Geography of Phetchabun province